Lotti Golden (born November 27, 1949) is an American singer-songwriter, record producer, poet and artist. Golden is best known for her 1969 debut album Motor-Cycle, on Atlantic Records.

Winner of the ASCAP Pop Award for songwriting and RIAA certified Gold and Platinum awards as a writer/producer, Golden has written and produced Top 5 hits in the US and abroad. Credited for her innovative work in early electro and Hip hop music, Golden is featured in the Rap Attack 3: African Rap To Global Hip Hop by David Toop, and Signed, Sealed, and Delivered: True Life Stories of Women of Pop for her pioneering work as a female record producer.

Early life

Childhood 
Lotti Golden was born in Manhattan to Sy (Seymour) Golden and Anita Golden (née Cohn), the elder of two daughters. Golden's parents, a strikingly handsome and fashionable pair, were avid jazz aficionados and foreign film buffs.  Golden soaked up the sounds of Billie Holiday and John Coltrane from an early age developing a lifelong passion for music and the arts.

Golden grew up in Brooklyn, New York where she attended Canarsie High School, serving as the school's Poet Laureate. Voted Most Likely to Succeed, Golden graduated with honors in 1967, winning the Creative Writing medal, the Lincoln Center Student Award for Academic Excellence, the Scholastic Magazine Award for National Achievement in Art, and a New York State Regents Scholarship. Golden was awarded the National League of Pen Women Prize for poetry and went on to attend Brooklyn College.

1964–1968: Early music career 
A birthday gift (a guitar) from Golden's parents at age eleven would chart her future course. Golden studied classical guitar and voice, but needing more of a creative outlet, soon found her niche as a singer-songwriter, using her abilities as both wordsmith and vocalist. To sing her compositions on demos Golden spent hours using a reel to reel tape recorder to perfect her vocal craft: "When women talk of their idols and influences…they tell stories about singing along with records, trying to emulate someone's voice…until they can begin to develop their own style." Golden explains: "I would practice singing to Aretha, Ray Charles, and the Marvelettes, till I could sing all of their licks and runs… the girls' bathroom in high school was a great place to try it out."

By the age of fourteen Golden was making forays into Manhattan, singing on demo sessions and peddling her songs to publishers, landing her first cover by Patti LaBelle and the Blue Belles.
By the time Golden completed high school, she had the beginnings of a musical autobiography about her adventures in New York's East Village and Lower East Side where she was a resident member of the Henry Street Settlement Playhouse, honing her skills as an actress and playwright. This would become the basis of her Atlantic Records debut LP, Motor-Cycle.

Recording artist

1969: Debut LP: Motor-Cycle 
Released on Atlantic Records in 1969, Motor-Cycle is a chronicle of Golden's life informed by New York City's counterculture. "It was a strange, way out scene for pretty, 19-year-old Golden," who wrote her memoir in music and lyrics because, according to Golden, "a book is too flat," The songs on Motor-Cycle deal with subjects like gender identity ("The Space Queens-Silky is Sad"), drug use ("Gonna Fay's"), and urban alienation ("Who Are Your Friends"). So essential was Golden's poetry and lyrics to the project, that a lyric sheet insert was included with the original release. The back cover of the LP contains the poem, "Night was a Better Blanket," alluding to the LP's backstory.

Golden was part of a new wave of female singers who began to shake up the status quo in the late Sixties. Breaking from the confines of pop they defined themselves by their confessional lyrics, taking on new controversial subject matter. In July 1969, Newsweek ran a feature story, "The Girls: Letting Go": "There has surfaced a new school of talented female troubadours, who not only sing, but write their own songs. What is common to them – to Joni Mitchell and Lotti Golden, to Laura Nyro, Melanie, and to Elyse Weinberg, are the personalized songs they write, like voyages of self-discovery, brimming with keen observation, and startling in the impact of their poetry"

Listed among the most influential albums of the era in The New York Times, "The Best of Rock: A Personal Discography," by music critic Nat Hentoff, Motor-Cycle is a synthesis of stream of consciousness confessional poetry, R&B infused vocals and a "sometimes satiric mélange of rock, jazz, blues and soul" with lyrics that evoke "a Kerouac novel."

On an album of "restlessly epic roadhouse suites" Golden uses the story-based format, featuring a cast of archetypal characters while playing the part of "emcee" of her own "aberrant cabaret." Golden's coming of age saga is likely the first rock concept album by a female recording artist.

Music critic Path, of Tiny Mix Tapes, explains how Motor-Cycle plays like a musical, transporting the listener to the late 1960s underground: "Golden gets help on Motor-Cycle from an impeccably arranged Atlantic Records session band… with a flawless, swinging rhythm team. Then, at key moments, the curtain goes up and they've got rows of saxes, trumpets, vibes…and you begin to realize that this is not the same song and dance… it's as if The Velvet Underground recorded for Motown." Golden writes of a "season in hell " she somehow manages to survive. "It's an extraordinary evocation of a life-style… and one girl's plunge into and out of it."

1968–69: The Making of Motor-Cycle 

Golden signed a publishing deal as a staff writer with Saturday Music during her senior year of high school. One afternoon as Golden was riding the elevator to her demo session, the company's owner, Bob Crewe stepped in while Golden was singing. When Crewe nodded his approval, Golden seized the opportunity, and in one breath told Crewe she was a staff writer at his publishing company and working on material for her own artist album. Intrigued, Crewe set up a meeting: "When Lotti brought her material to Crewe in the fall of 1967, he exclaimed, 'Good God, who are your friends?'" referring to the outrageous characters populating Golden's songs. Crewe was sold on doing the project, but asked Golden if she could wait one year while he cleared his schedule, and in 1968 the pair began recording Golden's autobiographical opus, Motor-Cycle, "a synthesis of funky singing and honest hip lyrics about urban teenage trauma." Atlantic Records moguls, Jerry Wexler and Ahmet Ertegün bought the [demo] tapes after one hearing, with Wexler "modestly telling his staff Golden would be the greatest single pop artist since Aretha Franklin."

The release of Motor-Cycle in 1969 generated considerable media interest in Golden. Look  magazine described Golden's songs and poetry as "rich in metaphor and starkly descriptive of people and places," stating: "Even in her musically precocious generation, she [Golden] stands out as a singer composer of phenomenal power and originality." In addition to features in national publications, Lotti Golden was identified by Carrie Donovan of Vogue as a fashion trendsetter, making several appearances in the magazine. Though Golden made no TV appearances, her impact on the contemporary music scene was such that she is referenced in the cultural commentary on television, The Glass Teat.  Still, Golden had concerns about the business side of her career, which she voiced in her Look magazine interview: "The easy part is to sit down and create. The hard part is trying to make yourself heard, the promotion."

For reasons that remain unclear today, Atlantic Records suddenly dropped the ball, failing to promote Motor-Cycle.  It is curious that none of the songs, (all over five minutes in length), were edited down to the standard 7” format for radio, and no single was released ahead of the LP, a standard Industry practice.  Atlantic  was going through a major corporate restructuring; its roster was packed in 1969, with Golden’s mentors Ahmet Ertegun signing British rock bands, and Jerry Wexler dividing his time between Miami and Muscle Shoals (Dusty Springfield, released on Atlantic that year) moving on. It can’t be overlooked that Golden had no management on a crowded label with a glut of releases that year. In such a competitive field, that was a fatal error.

In the years since its release, Motor-Cycle continues to gain popularity via the Internet, and social media "thanks to the unusual persistence of her [Golden's] art, and the power of listeners' preferences."
The LP remains a rich source of samples, with Mark Oliver Everett using Golden’s spoken voice from  “Gonna Fay’s” on his MC Honky project, to the original track from the LP, “Get Together (With Yourself)” appearing on the 2022  Hulu TV miniseries and soundtrack, Pam & Tommy.

Track listings

Motor-Cycle samples 
2003: Golden's spoken voice on "Gonna Fay's" (Motor-Cycle) is the centerpiece for "What a Bringdown" on I Am the Messiah (Spin-ART) by MC Honky, "widely considered to be Mark Oliver Everett (or "E") of the rock band Eels." 2006: Golden's African (Olatunji) inspired drumbeat on "Motor-Cycle Michael" (Motor-Cycle) appears on Beat Konducta Vol 1–2 Movie Scenes (Stones Throw Records) on the track "Gold Jungle (Tribe)" by hip-hop artist Madlib.

1970s 
Lotti Golden's eponymous sophomore offering was released on GRT Records (U.S. Label) in 1971. In a live performance for industry executives at NYC's Playboy Club, Golden was described by Cash Box as "GRT's Lotti: Incredible." Although elements of Golden's confessional approach remained (Billboard labeled one song "biographical") for the most part, Golden's self-titled LP moved away from the innovative format of Motor-Cycle. Writer Mitchell Shannon characterizes the shift: "Second time around, her music was more conventional and approachable, but lacked that initial compelling insistence of the previous release." Music critic, Robert Christgau, though not a fan of Golden (or Laura Nyro) thought the GRT record could take off with the proper promotion: "He [Christgau] wrote: 'Golden's egregious overstatement registers as a strength.' If you know about Christgau, you'll take that as an honest compliment." Shortly after Golden's album was released, financial problems caused the GRT label to go out of business.

Music journalism

In the 1970s Lotti Golden wrote rock journalism, primarily covering her musician friends. In a Crawdaddy! feature story Golden provides unique perspective on the genius of Mike (Michael) Bloomfield chronicling her 1972 San Francisco visit with the legendary guitar player and in Rolling Stone, Golden explores the making of keyboardist (and co-founder with Bloomfied of Electric Flag) Barry Goldberg's first solo LP. Golden's articles have appeared in Creem, Circus and other publications.

Writer/producer

1980–85: Electro/hip hop 

In the early 1980s Lotti Golden transitioned from artist to writer/producer. Golden's 1982 international dance hit "I Specialize in Love" co-written with musician Richard Scher, enabled her to move into record production: "The success gave [Golden] the freedom to demand production rights to her songs." In an interview for the anthology, Signed, Sealed and Delivered-True Life Stories of Women in Pop, Golden stated that performing live was OK, but she preferred the recording studio, "that wonderful world of sound [where] anything was possible."

As a writer/producer, Golden gained artistic control of her work, becoming a major progenitor of electro and early hip hop. UK music historian Kevin Pearce describes Golden's transition from artist to producer: "I can still remember the delight at reading [David] Toop's "Rap Attack" and realizing that the Lotti Golden involved as part of electro pioneers Warp 9 in the early 1980s was the same Lotti Golden recording for Atlantic in 1969... with Bob Crewe producing the fantastic Motor-Cycle, one of the greatest and criminally rarest records ever". 
Golden, with co-writer/producer Scher, wrote and recorded under the moniker Warp 9, a studio production project at the forefront of the electro movement, to which they eventually added live personnel. Warp 9's electro classics Nunk (1982) and Light Years Away (1983), a tale of ancient astronaut visitation, characterize the sci-fi, afrofuturist aspect of electro. Described as "the perfect instance of hip hop's contemporary ramifications," Golden and Scher worked "real emotion and intelligence into the world of experimental hip-hop and electro." Their records are ranked among the most iconic of the electro hip hop era.
Among the early production teams using the Roland TR-808 drum machine, Golden and Scher created a brand of "electo hip hop records with gorgeous textures and multiple layers." Newsweek'''s "Language Arts & Disciplines" highlighted Warp 9's experimental use of vocoders in Light Years Away. The Guardian (May 2014) characterized Light Years Away as "
a cornerstone of early 80's beatbox afrofuturism, inspired by Grandmaster's Flash's The Message, a brilliantly spare and sparse piece of electro hip-hop traversing inner and outer space." DJ Greg Wilson, the first to embrace electro in the UK, calculates the genre's influence on art and culture as "huge," ushering in the computer age, hip hop, and generating "a whole new approach to popular music."

Warp 9's hits brought Golden to the attention of Island Record's chief Chris Blackwell, resulting in a worldwide publishing deal with Island Music. Golden (with Scher) went on to write for, produce and/or remix artists including Diana Ross' hit single "Dirty Looks" from her Red Hot Rhythm & Blues album and TV Special, Patti Austin, Jennifer Holliday (Say You Love Me), The Manhattans, Brenda K. Starr (I Want Your Love featuring guest rapper Adam Yauch of the Beastie Boys), Nina Hagen and Jimmy Cliff.

During the early 1980s Golden began a longstanding collaborative relationship with producer Arthur Baker, co-writing the Latin Freestyle music classic "Pickin' Up Pieces" by Brenda K Starr"Freestyle Greatest Beats: Complete Collection, Vol. 8". and co-producing Jennifer Holliday's Billboard Hot 100 hit, "Hard Times For Lovers" (Geffen). Golden contributed background vocals/arrangements for many of Baker's projects including the Goon Squad's "Eight Arms to Hold You," featured on The Goonies: Original Motion Picture Soundtrack. Golden worked with Baker on Artists United Against Apartheid, Sun City, and is among the sixty-one artists (including Lou Reed, Bono, Grandmaster Melle Mel, Keith Richards, Bob Dylan and Gil Scott Heron) who participated in what rock critic Dave Marsh describes as "the most diverse line up of popular musicians ever assembled for a single session.""Sun City Liner Notes". Golden appears in the video.

 1985–89 
Lotti Golden relocated to Los Angeles in 1985 establishing herself in LA's burgeoning songwriting scene, signing a worldwide publishing deal with MCA Music (later renewing and extending her contract with David Renzer, Chairman/CEO of the Universal Music Publishing Group). In 1986, MCA Creative Director Carol Ware introduced Golden to writer/producer Tommy Faragher, "on a hunch that the two young writer/producers would click as a team." The pair quickly gained a reputation for "richly produced, finely crafted urban dance music." By 1987 Golden was working almost exclusively with Faragher,Lavan, Metzler Rosemary (February 14, 1988). "When Cupid & Mammon Meet: It Can Be a Pofitable Venture Daily News "Business Section" New York. telling Cashbox: "We have a gold record [The Jets] our first year working together." Golden returned to New York's Upper West Side with Faragher, building a state-of-the-art recording studio, "decorated with archival black and white photos of John Coltrane, Billie Holiday, [and] Lester Young, souvenirs from Lotti's jazz-fan parents."

On Valentine's Day, 1988, Golden & Faragher were featured in the Business Section of the New York Daily News. The article disclosed the pair feared romantic involvement would ruin their working relationship, but they took the chance, got married and formed their own production operation. In fact, the production on their own material was "so good they were invited in to produce tracks they didn't write," which included the R&B Pop group, the Jets' LP Magic on MCA (1987), certified RIAA Platinum, followed by Brenda K. Starr, certified RIAA Gold, yielding the single "You Should Be Loving Me," which appeared on the soundtrack and film She's Out of Control. In 1988, Golden and Faragher were enlisted by A&M to write and produce EG Daily's sophomore effort Lace Around the Wound (1989), featuring the single "Some People." Although the album never got the promotional push it deserved, several songs were later covered by Celine Dion and appeared on the hit TV show California Dreams.

The real breakthrough for Golden in her partnership with Faragher came in 1989, when producer Arthur Baker phoned, announcing that Clive Davis was looking for a hit single to launch Taylor Dayne's sophomore LP. By the time Baker arrived, Golden had a working chord progression and title. The three completed the song in one session and Baker left with the demo in his pocket, vocals by Golden, resulting in the Top 5 Billboard Hot 100 hit, "With Every Beat of My Heart," the lead single from Dayne's Certified RIAA 3× Platinum Can't Fight Fate (Arista) album.

 1990s 
Lotti Golden was honored with the ASCAP Pop Award for "With Every Beat of My Heart" in 1991. Golden's "If You Lean on Me," was recorded by Canadian artist Colin James  Sudden Stop LP and featured in the 1991 action film, Run. Golden and Faragher's work with the O'Jays, fused urban R&B with their classic soul sound, coming "closest to accomplishing that fusion with the smoking, politically charged "Something For Nothing." The album won the O'Jays their first American Music Award in 1991. Dubbed "luminous tunesmiths and veteran popsters"  in Billboard, the team's 1993 international hit, The Right Kind of Love (Giant Records) co-produced with Robbie Nevil (Billboard Top 15) featured on Fox's hit TV series Beverly Hills, 90210 (listed by Entertainment Weekly at No. 20 of the top TV shows of the past 25 years) also appeared on the Beverly Hills 90210: The Soundtrack.

Golden and Faragher made music history in 1993, producing the British R&B girl band Eternal, the first female group to reach one million units (album sales) in the UK. Eternal's debut LP, Always & Forever (EMI), certified 4× Platinum by BPI paved the way for other female UK groups like All Saints and the Spice Girls. Golden's experience as a vocalist helped shape Eternal's vocal sound on the four songs she co-produced and wrote with Faragher, including the international hit single "Oh Baby I...", which topped the UK Singles Chart at No. 4. The first UK girl group with six singles to reach the Top 15 on the UK charts from their debut LP, Eternal went on to become one of Britain's most successful girl groups achieving both international and domestic success.

In 1994, Golden co-wrote Keep on Pushing Love for veteran soul singer Al Green. The four way collaboration (Golden, Green, Baker & Faragher) resulted in  "one of [Green's] finest recent releases." The single appears on Green's 1995 LP, Your Heart's in Good Hands, "a solid project that approaches the Rev. Green's classic work with Hi Records." In 1993 and 1994, Golden and Faragher reached No. 1 on Billboard's Jazz Charts, with Soul Embrace by Richard Elliot and Diane Schuur's Heart To Heart album, (GRP) featuring "Freedom" performed by blues legend, BB King.

Throughout the 1990s Golden and Faragher continued to write and produce international hits that appeared on the UK Singles Chart and UK Albums Chart for artists including Dana Dawson the group Montage and Arthur Baker. In 1998, Golden & Faragher introduced UK R&B artist Hinda Hicks with the Top 25 hit, "If You Want Me" propelling her debut album, Hinda (Island Records) to No. 20 on the UK Albums Chart, winning two 1999 Brit Awards nominations.

Golden's partnership with Faragher continued for over a decade. An interview in the "Music Connection" provides insight into the collaborative methodology that made the pair a successful team: "I get involved in a lot of technical things, working out the arrangement and stuff like that," Faragher states, "[and] Lotti works on the complete feeling." Describing how songwriters can sometimes get too close to their work, becoming unwilling to modify or delete sections, Faragher pointed out, it was Golden, the iconoclast, who was willing to scrap work she felt wasn't up to par: "I might be attached to a certain section we worked so hard getting, and Lotti would say, 'Maybe we should throw this part out.' I go, 'Oh, no, you're kidding. I'm shocked-[but] she's right. She's absolutely right."' By the close of the decade, Golden's professional partnership with Faragher ended in divorce; they have one child.

In 2000, Golden's "I Should've Never Let You Go" co-written with Faragher, was the second hit single from the Australian girl group Bardot's No. 1 debut album, Bardot, certified 2× Platinum by ARIA, from the Popstars reality TV show. Golden continued working into the early 2000s, but because her recording studio was lost in the divorce process, she could no longer artistically justify writing songs without creative control. The "Music Connection" interview, appearing over ten years before the partnership break-up, reveals just how important the production aspect of songwriting had become for Golden: "Golden & Faragher's pursuit of songwriting and production seems eons beyond the days of a cluttered Brill Building office with an upright piano. What environment does a songwriter need today? Golden: 'This one.' (She gestures towards the conglomeration of keyboards, computers and recording equipment)."

 Discography 
Songwriter/Selected Songs 
 I Specialize in Love                             Sharon Brown
 Nunk                                 Warp 9
 Light Years Away             Warp 9
 ‘’Pickin' Up Pieces’’Brenda K. Starr
 Some People             E.G. Daily
 Dirty Looks                      Diana Ross
 Hard Times for Lovers                      Jennifer Holliday
 With Every Beat of My Heart    Taylor Dayne
 Keep On Pushing Love                       Al Green
 Oh Baby I...  (1994)                              Eternal
 The Right Kind of Love  (                   Jeremy Jordan
 I Should've Never Let You Go              Bardot

Literacy advocacy
In collaboration with the 92nd Street Y's Educational Outreach Program, Golden designed a songwriting workshop for the advancement of literacy, engaging New York City public school children in the art and craft of songwriting. The classroom based program, "Lyrics & Literacy/Words are Power" was created by Golden in accordance with the New York State Learning Standards for the Arts and implemented in East Harlem by Golden and the 92nd St. Y.

2010–presentThe Rolling Stone Years, a 2011 memoir by rock photographer Baron Wolman featured a previously unreleased portrait of Golden. In the book,  Wolman recalls first hearing about Golden from Ahmet Ertegun and Jann Wenner; the trio routinely hit the New York clubs, scouting new talent, (see photo “The Making of Motor-Cycle, 1968-9”). A review of Wolman's book in The Wire'', references Golden's previously unpublished portrait: "You’ll have your own personal favorites...but [Wolman's] portrait of Lotti Golden, an artist who is unknown to me, appears interesting, intriguing, and important because of Wolman's great photograph."

On Record Store Day, April 16, 2016, High Moon Records reissued the original Atlantic 7" single that followed Motor-Cycle (with the participation of Warner Bros. Records and Rhino Records). The reissue is a remastered version of a medley of the Isley Brothers song It's Your Thing and "Sock It to Me Baby.” The Atlantic release of Golden performing a cover in 1969 was certainly an unusual way to introduce an artist who writes all her own material, with no single release ahead of the LP.   On the B-side, is a girl-group inspired song written by Golden, "Annabelle With Bells (Home Made Girl)," a "gem that sounds like the Ronettes for the hippie generation." The reissue contains a picture sleeve with new cover art, a previously unreleased photo of Golden, and remastered audio. "Annabelle With Bells (Home Made Girl)," was not included in the 1969 LP, due to time constraints in pre-digital recording.

References

External links 
 Baron Wolman Photography
 http://jonimitchell.com/library/originals/jmOriginal_2664.pdf
 http://www.recordstoreday.com/SpecialRelease/8596
 https://www.theguardian.com/music/2014/may/14/the-101-strangest-records-on-spotify-warp-9-its-a-beat-wave
 https://www.theguardian.com/music/2017/jan/26/from-joni-mitchell-to-laura-marling-how-female-troubadours-changed-music

1950 births
Living people
Singers from New York City
American women singer-songwriters
Guitarists from New York City
Afrofuturists
20th-century American guitarists
People from Brooklyn
Brooklyn College alumni
20th-century American women guitarists
Singer-songwriters from New York (state)
21st-century American women